Grant R. Osborne (July 7, 1942 – November 4, 2018) was an American theologian and New Testament scholar. He was Professor of New Testament at Trinity Evangelical Divinity School.

Biography

Education 
Osborne got a B.A. from the Fort Wayne Bible College, a M.A. from the Trinity Evangelical Divinity School, and a PhD from the University of Aberdeen. He also has done postdoctoral research at the university of Cambridge and university of Marburg.

Career 
Osborne has taught at Winnipeg Theological Seminary and the university of Aberdeen and has pastored churches in Ohio and Illinois. From 1977 to 2016, he has been professor of New Testament at the Trinity Evangelical Divinity School.

He specialized in biblical hermeneutics, the Gospels and the book of Revelation. He is best known for his concept of the "hermeneutical spiral", denoting an "upward and constructive process of moving from earlier pre-, understanding to fuller understanding, and the returning back to check and to review the need for correction or change in this preliminary understanding."

He was a member of the Bible Translation Committee for the Holy Bible: New Living Translation. He served as General Translator for the Gospels and Acts.

He was a member of the Society of Biblical Literature, the Evangelical Theological Society, and the Institute of Biblical Research.

In 2013, a Festschrift was published in his honor.  On the Writing of New Testament Commentaries: Festschrift for Grant R. Osborne on the Occasion of His 70th Birthday included contributions from Craig L. Blomberg, D. A. Carson, Scot McKnight, Douglas J. Moo, Stanley E. Porter, and Kevin J. Vanhoozer.

Theology
Osborne held Arminian soteriological views. In "A classical Arminian view", he wrote in favour of a possible apostasy for the genuine believer.

Works

Books

Edited by

Chapters

Festschrift

Notes and references

Citations

Sources

External links

1942 births
2018 deaths
20th-century American theologians
20th-century evangelicals
21st-century evangelicals
Alumni of the University of Aberdeen
American biblical scholars
American Christian theologians
Arminian theologians
Bible commentators
Evangelical theologians
Hermeneutists
New Testament scholars
Trinity Evangelical Divinity School alumni
Writers from Queens, New York